A backup camera (also called a reversing camera or rear-view camera) is a special type of video camera that is produced specifically for the purpose of being attached to the rear of a vehicle to aid in backing up and to alleviate the rear blind spot. It is designed to avoid a backup collision. The area directly behind vehicles has been described as a "killing zone" due to associated accidents. Backup cameras are usually connected to the vehicle head unit display. A common variant is a Surround View system, which assembles a synthetic but positionally accurate top-down view of the vehicle and its adjacencies.

Backup cameras have been regulated by law in Canada and the United States since 2018. Backup cameras are increasingly common on new vehicles and beginning in May 2018 they are now required on all new automobiles sold in the United States.

Function
The design of a backup camera is distinct from other cameras in that the image is horizontally flipped so that the output is a mirror image. This is necessary because the camera and the driver face opposite directions, and without it, the camera's right would be on the driver's left and vice versa. A mirrored image makes the orientation of the display consistent with the physical mirrors installed on the vehicle. A backup camera typically uses a wide-angle or fisheye lens.  While such a lens impairs the camera's ability to see faraway objects, it allows the camera to see an uninterrupted horizontal path from one rear corner to the other. The camera is typically pointed at a downward angle to view potential obstacles on the ground.

Backup cameras make use of dashboard screens that are also used with GPS navigation systems. Inside the vehicle, the display is typically wired to automatically sense when the transmission is set in reverse, showing the backup view on the dashboard screen while the vehicle is in reverse and/or providing grid guidelines by detecting the parking lot markings to aid the driver.

Variations
Backup cameras are produced in different varieties depending on the application.
 Backup cameras can be added as aftermarket additions to vehicles that do not come with factory-fitted systems. They are available in both wired and wireless versions.
 For large vehicles such as motorhomes, camera systems with built-in servomechanisms allow the driver to remotely pan and tilt the camera.
Wireless Backup Cameras come with a wireless camera and receiver, which make it easier and cheaper to install them.
 Built-in audio intercoms (one-way or two-way) are used in addition to the camera system for communicating with a spotter outside the vehicle - common when backing large trailers or launching boats.
 Night vision cameras use a series of infrared lights for backing in the dark, when the positioning or the intensity of the vehicle's white reverse lights are insufficient for this purpose.

 Portable or semi-permanent all-in-one camera systems, also known as dashboard cameras or dashcams, are typically sold for vehicles that don't have displays permanently installed in the dash. Such systems consist of a small portable screen that can be affixed on the dashboard or on a rearview mirror, and a length of wire to reach the cameras, including a backup camera.
 Some backup and rear cameras are connected to displays on the rearview mirror and are used in vehicles to detect activity behind the car to "avoid the tooling, software, hardware, and testing costs associated with integrating the display/feature in other areas of the vehicle."
 License-plate-frame versions permit installation without any permanent vehicle modifications.
 Custom cameras: brake light cameras are combination devices that contain a camera, while still illuminating as a brake light. Some backup cameras also use a combination of LEDs surrounding the camera lens to illuminate the surroundings while in use.

History
The first backup camera was used in the 1956 Buick Centurion concept car, presented in January 1956 at the General Motors Motorama. The vehicle had a rear-mounted television camera that sent images to a TV screen on the dashboard in place of the rear-view mirror.

Later the 1972 Volvo Experimental Safety Car (VESC) had a backup camera. However, the camera did not make it into the following Volvo 240 model.

The first production automobile to incorporate a backup camera was the 1991 Toyota Soarer Limited (UZZ31 and UZZ32), which was only available in Japan and not on U.S. counterpart Lexus SC. The Toyota system used a color EMV screen, with a rear-spoiler-mounted CCD camera. The system was discontinued in 1997. In April 2000, Nissan's Infiniti division introduced the RearView Monitor on the 2002 Infiniti Q45 flagship sedan at the 2000 New York International Auto Show. Using coloured onscreen guide lines as a parking distance parameter, the RearView Monitor operated from a license-plate-mounted camera in the trunk that transmitted a mirrored image to an 7-inch in-dash LCD screen. It was available as optional equipment upon North American launch in March 2001. The 2002 Nissan Primera introduced the RearView Monitor backup camera system to territories outside Japan and North America.

Aftermarket options for cars have been available for some time.  Electronics manufacturers have made multiple car upgrades available that can be installed by professionals without replacing the car's center console.

Others
Other types of camera systems can give a more comprehensive view.

Surround-view cameras

Infiniti introduced the first surround-view cameras, making the system available on the 2008 EX35 and marketing it as the Around View Monitor. The system used four cameras located at the front, back and sides of the vehicle, feeding images to an image processing unit to analyze, assemble and synthesize inputs together to create a synthetic but positionally accurate top-down view of the car and its surroundings. In most modern systems, the pictures appear in such detail that it's difficult to believe they were not taken from above the vehicle.

BMW introduced their competing system called Surround View in 2009 on the F10 5 Series. Other automobile manufacturers have since offered similar systems, e.g., Bird's Eye View Camera (Toyota), or Surround Vision (Chevrolet). Collectively, J.D. Power calls such systems surround-view cameras.

Side mirror
First offered in October 2018, the Japanese market Lexus ES can be optioned with cameras as side view mirrors. This feature is also offered as an option on the Audi Q8 e-tron and Hyundai Ioniq 5.

Wireless Backup Camera

This is an advanced type of reversing camera that does not require the use of cables between the camera itself and the display. It functions remotely. Wireless rear-view cameras usually have separate sources of power from the display. The cameras are usually powered by the same power source as the brake and thus switch on automatically when the reverse gear is engaged. The majority of these backup cameras come with a transmitter near the camera and a receiver near the display for relaying signals and live images. Some models, such as the Pearl RearVision backup camera, made by Pearl Automation, used solar energy for power. The display for these types of backup camera can be powered from the 12-volt socket on the car's dashboard. Some of the displays are also integrated on the rear-view mirror thereby giving it a multipurpose function. Some models also sync directly with a mobile phone using an app which then acts as the display. The main advantage of this type of backup camera is that it is extremely easy to install and rarely requires professional installation. The installation of these cameras also does not interfere with a car's look as minimal to no drilling or laying of wires is required. However, some wireless cameras are quite expensive.

Blind spot monitors and other technology

Blind spot monitors are an option that may include more than monitoring the sides of the vehicle. It can include "Cross Traffic Alert", which alerts drivers backing out of a parking space when traffic is approaching from the sides.

Mandates
In the United States, the Cameron Gulbransen Kids Transportation Safety Act of 2007 required the United States Department of Transportation to issue backup-collision-safety regulations within three years and require full compliance within four years after final rulemaking.

The law specified a statutory deadline of February 2011 for issuing the final regulations.  However, under the Obama administration, the USDOT repeatedly granted itself extensions to the deadline, claiming it needed more time to analyze costs and benefits of the requirement.  In September 2013, Greg Gulbransen, the father of the child whom the law was named after, along with a group of consumers and advocates submitted a petition to the Second Circuit Court of Appeals, demanding that the USDOT implement regulations on backup cameras within 90 days.  About half of model year 2012 automobiles were equipped with backup cameras.

On March 31, 2014, three years past its deadline, the U.S. National Highway Traffic Safety Administration announced that it would require all automobiles sold in the United States built beginning in May 2018 to include backup cameras. On October 31, 2016, Transport Canada issued a similar mandate beginning at the same time.

See also 

 Automatic parking
 Blind spot monitor
 Collision avoidance system
 Experimental Safety Vehicle (ESV)
 Intelligent Parking Assist System
 Intelligent car
 Lane departure warning system
 Omniview technology
 Parking sensors
 RCA
 Waterproof
 Wing mirror

Notes

External links 

Advanced driver assistance systems
Vehicle safety technologies